Allofustis is a Gram-positive, rod-shaped, facultatively anaerobic and non-spore-forming bacterial genus from the family of Carnobacteriaceae, with one known species (Allofustis seminis).

References

Further reading 
 

Lactobacillales
Monotypic bacteria genera
Bacteria genera